Rockbridge is an unincorporated community and census-designated place (CDP) in eastern Good Hope Township, Hocking County, Ohio, United States. It has a post office with the ZIP code 43149.  It is located at the interchange of U.S. Route 33 and State Route 374, between Logan and Lancaster. As of the 2010 census the population of the CDP was 182.

Demographics

History
A post office called Rockbridge has been in operation since 1863. The community is named after a natural bridge that is located to the east in the Rockbridge State Nature Preserve.

References

Census-designated places in Hocking County, Ohio
Census-designated places in Ohio